María José García Borge (born November 9, 1956) is a Spanish nuclear physicist. She serves as a research professor at the Consejo Superior de Investigaciones Cientificas (CSIC) in Madrid and is a leader and spokesperson for ISOLDE at CERN in Switzerland. She is a member of the Real Academia de las Ciencias and was a fellow of the European Organization for Nuclear Research from 1984–86.

Biography

Early life and education 
Borge was born on November 9, 1956 in Madrid. Her parents were José García Prol and Esther Borge Rodriguez. She earned three degrees from University Complutense, graduating in 1978 with a physics degree, 1979 with a graduate physics degree, and 1982 with a Doctor of Philosophy in physics.

Career 
Borge worked as a teaching assistant at University Complutense from 1981–83. From 1982–1983, she worked as a postdoctoral researcher at University of Arizona. In 1986, she began working as a researcher at the National Research Council in Madrid.

In 2012, she began heading the physics group for the ISOLDE facility at CERN.

Personal life 
On September 9, 1989, Borge married Olof Erik Ingemar Tengblad. Borge is of ethnic Spanish descent.

References 

1956 births
Spanish physicists
University of Alcalá alumni
People from Madrid
Spanish women scientists
Living people
People associated with CERN
Women nuclear physicists